Roy Loder (17 December 1896 – 13 February 1964) was an Australian cricketer. He played two first-class matches for New South Wales between 1926/27 and 1928/29.

See also
 List of New South Wales representative cricketers

References

External links
 

1896 births
1964 deaths
Australian cricketers
New South Wales cricketers
People from Maitland, New South Wales
Cricketers from New South Wales